is the seventh single by the Japanese singer Maaya Sakamoto, released June 21, 2000. It was also the ending theme for the Japanese anime film Escaflowne. The lyrics were written by Yuho Iwasato, while the music was composed by Yoko Kanno. The cover image was drawn by Nobuteru Yūki.

"Yubiwa" is also included on the soundtrack for the Escaflowne movie.

Track list
 : single ver.
 
 Yubiwa: single ver. (without Maaya)
 Vector (without Maaya)

Charts

References

2000 singles
2000 songs
Maaya Sakamoto songs
Victor Entertainment singles
Anime songs
Japanese film songs
Songs written for animated films
Songs with lyrics by Yuho Iwasato
Songs written by Yoko Kanno